Lou Gellermann (18 August 1936 – 13 May 2016) was a collegiate athlete, coach, and public address announcer for the University of Washington (UW) Huskies.

Gellerman was a member of the Huskies crew team that rowed at the Henley Royal Regatta in 958. That same year, he graduated with a communications degree.  He went to the United States Naval Academy to coach the crew team before coming back to UW to coach the freshman in 1968.

References

1936 births
2016 deaths
Public address announcers
College football announcers
University of Washington alumni
Washington Huskies men's rowers
United States Naval Academy people
College rowing coaches in the United States